

The Stoddard-Hamilton T-9 Stalker, also known as the Arocet AT-9 or Arocet AT-T Tactical Trainer, was an American military training monoplane designed and built by Stoddard-Hamilton Aircraft of Arlington, Washington and based on the Stoddard-Hamilton Glasair III.

Design and development
First flown on 24 July 1988 the Stalker  is a military training version of the Glasair III, an all-composite, cantilever, low-wing monoplane. The Stalker is powered by a  Allison 250-B17D turboprop driving a three-bladed metal tractor propeller. It has a retractable tricycle landing gear and the enclosed cockpit has two seats side-by-side with dual controls and a zero/zero pilot extraction system. The Stalker has two underwing hardpoints outboard of the landing gear for military ordnance. The prototype was destroyed in a fatal accident on 29 May 1989.

Specifications

References

Notes

Bibliography

1980s United States military trainer aircraft
Low-wing aircraft
Single-engined tractor aircraft
T-9 Stalker
Single-engined turboprop aircraft
Aircraft first flown in 1988